Then There's Now is the second album by The String Cheese Incident keyboard player Kyle Hollingsworth, released on September 15, 2009. The album features Dave Watts (of the Motet) on drums, Ryan Jalbert on Guitar, Garrett Sayers on bass, and Damien Hines and DJ Logic on turntables.  It also features Dar Williams, Liza Oxnard (of Zuba), and Alex Botwin (of Pnuma Trio).

Track listing

Track Listing for Then There's Now
 Way That It Goes (Formigoni/Hollingsworth) – 3:41
 She (Hollingsworth) – 3:53
 Piece Of Mine (Hollingsworth) – 4:22
 Phat Cat (Hollingsworth) – 4:33
 Don't Wake Me (Hollingsworth) – 5:07
 All I need (Hollingsworth/Jalbert/Sayers/Watts)  – 2:25
 Wide Open (Hollingsworth) – 5:52 
 Too Young (Hollingsworth) – 3:57
 All Inside (Hollingsworth) – 5:21
 On Fire (Hollingsworth) –

Credits
Kyle Hollingsworth – Keyboards
 Dave Watts - Drums
 Ryan Jalbert - Guitar
 Garrett Sayers - Bass

Additional Personnel
 Damien Hines - Turntable
 DJ Logic - Turntable
 Alex Botwin

References

2009 albums